The 2021 Pac-12 Conference men's basketball tournament was a postseason men's basketball tournament for the Pac-12 Conference, which was played March 10–13, 2021, at T-Mobile Arena on the Las Vegas Strip in Paradise, Nevada. The winner was Oregon State, which was the first for the Beavers in the history of the tournament. They received the conference's automatic bid to the 2021 NCAA Division I men's basketball tournament. The 2020 Tournament had been cancelled after the first round due to the Covid-19 pandemic. The 2021 tournament was played, but with only family of student-athletes as spectators in attendance.

Seeds
Eleven of the 12 Pac-12 teams competed in the tournament. The Arizona Wildcats did not compete in the tournament; the university self-imposed a postseason ban for the 2020-21 season due to ongoing NCAA investigations into corruption within the program. Teams were seeded by record within the conference, with tiebreakers in place to seed teams with identical conference records. The top five teams received a bye to the quarterfinals.

Schedule

^According to the Pac-12, family members were allowed to attend, but the general public was not allowed. As a result, the Pac-12 has not released official attendance numbers.

Bracket
* denotes overtime period
** denotes double overtime period</onlyinclude>

Game statistics

First round

Quarterfinals

Semifinals

Championship

Awards and honors

Team and tournament leaders

All-Tournament Team

Tournament notes
Five teams were extended invitations to the 2021 NCAA tournament: Colorado, Oregon, Oregon State, UCLA, and USC.  The five bids marks the most for the Conference since securing a record seven in 2015-16. Oregon State was not expected to be invited to the tournament, and changed the number of predicted bids of the Pac-12 from four to five. The team first out originally predicted in the field was Louisville.
No teams from the Pac-12 were invited to the 2021 National Invitation Tournament, which was reduced in size.

In the NCAA tournament, UCLA won the 11 seed play-in game, and then all five teams advanced to the round of 32 on the opening weekend. Four teams advanced to round of sixteen. Three teams advanced to the round of eight: Oregon State, UCLA, and USC. USC and Oregon played each other for the final Elite 8 spot. UCLA reached the Final Four as a 11-seed First Four team.

Each win in the NCAA tournament by a conference team gains a payout "unit" for the conference over six years. The Pac-12 team wins in the 2021 tournament gained a record 19 units, which will cause almost US$40 million to be paid to the conference by 2027.

See also
2021 Pac-12 Conference women's basketball tournament

References

Tournament
Pac-12 Conference men's basketball tournament
Basketball competitions in the Las Vegas Valley
College basketball tournaments in Nevada
Pac-12 Conference men's basketball tournament
Pac-12 Conference men's basketball tournament
College sports tournaments in Nevada